Tomrefjorden is a fjord in Vestnes Municipality in Møre og Romsdal county, Norway. The Norwegian County Road 661 follows the shoreline around most of the fjord and it passes through the villages of Fiksdal (on the western shore), Tomra (on the southern shore), and Vik (on the eastern shore).

See also
List of Norwegian Fjords

References

Fjords of Møre og Romsdal
Vestnes